The 2019 North Tyneside Metropolitan Borough Council election took place on 2 May 2019 to elect members of North Tyneside Metropolitan Borough Council in England. This took place on the same day as other local elections across the UK including the first of 2019 North of Tyne mayoral election.

All of the seats being contested were last contested in 2015.

Results summary

Ward results

Battle Hill

Benton

Camperdown

Chirton

Collingwood

Cullercoats

Howdon

Killingworth

Longbenton

Monkseaton North

Monkseaton South

Northumberland

Preston

Riverside

St. Mary's

Tynemouth

Valley

Wallsend

Weetslade

Whitley Bay

References

2019 English local elections
May 2019 events in the United Kingdom
2019
21st century in Tyne and Wear